Anne Katherine Carnell  (née Knowlman; born 30 May 1955) is an Australian businesswoman and former Liberal Party politician, who served as the third Chief Minister of the Australian Capital Territory (ACT) from 1995 to 2000.

Early life and pharmacy career
Carnell was born on 30 May 1955, in Brisbane, Queensland. Her parents owned a small accounting business.

As a teenager she struggled with anorexia and was sent away to recover at Sydney Hospital. She battled the illness for four years.

Heading back to Brisbane after her hospitalisation, Carnell returned to her studies and graduated from the University of Queensland in 1976 with a pharmacy degree. She married husband Ian Carnell in July 1977 and together they moved to Canberra, arriving August 1977. She bought her own pharmacy business in Red Hill in 1981. She owned and managed the pharmacy until 2000.

She was the inaugural chair of the ACT Branch of the Australian Pharmacy Guild, serving in the position between 1988 and 1994. as well as National Vice-President of the guild between 1990 and 1994.

Among other positions she was: Chairman of the Canberra and Southern District Pharmacists Company Ltd (1982–1992), Vice-President of the Retail Industry and Training Council, ACT (1987–1991), Councillor at the Australian Institute of Pharmacy Management (1990–1991), Member of the ACT Board of Health (1990–1991), and a Member of the Pharmacy Restructuring Authority (1990–1991).

Politics
Carnell joined the Liberal Party in 1991 and was elected to the second ACT Legislative Assembly in 1992. She became Leader of the Opposition in 1993, succeeding Trevor Kaine.

After winning 7 of 17 seats in the 1995 ACT election, the Liberal Party formed a minority government with Carnell as Chief Minister. The government was re-elected in the 1998 election. She held the portfolios of Minister for Health and Community Care (1995–1998), Minister Responsible for Multicultural and International Affairs (1995–2000), Minister for Business and Employment (1997–1998) and Minister for Business, Tourism and the Arts (2000).

Canberra hospital implosion

The Carnell Government was severely criticised following the death of twelve-year-old Katie Bender, when the de-commissioned Royal Canberra Hospital was imploded on 13 July 1997 to make way for the National Museum of Australia. Bender died instantly when she was struck by a one kilogram fragment of steel which had been thrown about 430 metres across Lake Burley Griffin by the force of the explosion.

The Coroner cleared Carnell as Chief Minister of any personal responsibility. The Coroner did find in his report that the Government had turned the implosion into a 'public circus' and that this was with the approval of the Chief Minister. The public was invited by the Government to attend and witness the event, resulting in the largest crowd in Canberra's history, in excess of 100,000. The Coroner found that the Government had been cavalier in its attitude to the warnings from a health union about the possible dangers of some aspects of the proposed implosion. The Coroner summarised that, "the evidence on this topic leads me to conclude that Carnell was poorly briefed and advised on this subject matter. The quality of the reply to the HSUA was sacrificed in the interests of speed and expediency".

Bruce Stadium redevelopment 
In October 2000, Carnell resigned, pre-empting a no-confidence motion in relation to cost over-runs in the Bruce Stadium redevelopment project. The project had a $27.3 million budget, of which $12.3 million was provided for by the ACT government and $15 million was to be sourced from the private sector. However, the project eventually cost $82 million, and was solely funded by the government. An ACT Auditor-General's review found that the project's $27.3 million cost estimate had not undergone proper assessment, review or analysis. The review also found that while private financing had been included in the project budget, no funds had been offered or provided by the private sector.

Resignation
Carnell resigned as Chief Minister on 17 October 2000, before the no-confidence motion was moved against her. She was replaced as Chief Minister by Gary Humphries.

Reflecting on the end of her career in 2012, Carnell told media that she took ministerial responsibility for breaches of the Financial Management Act related to the Bruce Stadium redevelopment because it had occurred in her portfolio, even though the breaches happened without her knowledge. Carnell told reporters that interpretation of ministerial responsibility in the Legislative Assembly had become "really different" in the time since, comparing her downfall in 2000, to current events in 2012, surrounding former Chief Minister Katy Gallagher, who was cleared of ministerial responsibility for data-tampering in her health portfolio.

Life after politics 
After resigning her post as the Chief Minister of the Australian Capital Territory, Carnell has worked in a variety of positions.

 She made a successful bid for election to the National Roads and Motorists' Association (NRMA) board in August 2001. Carnell resigned her role as NRMA director in 2002.
 She was appointed chairperson of General Practice Education and Training Ltd by the health minister Michael Wooldridge in 2001, and re-appointed by Woolridge's successor Tony Abbott in 2004. 
 She spent three years as executive director of the National Association of Forest Industries (NAFI). 
 Between 2006 and 2008 Carnell was the chief executive officer at the Australian General Practice Network. 
 In 2008 Carnell was appointed as the CEO of the Australian Food and Grocery Council. 
 She was the CEO of the non-profit organisation, beyondblue, from 2012 to 2014.
 Since March, 2016, Carnell was the inaugural Australian Small Business and Family Enterprise Ombudsman (ASBFEO).

She was appointed an Officer of the Order of Australia (AO) in the Australia Day Honours list of 2006, for her services and contributions to the Australian Capital Territory.

On 29 July 2007, nearly a decade after her first marriage dissolved, Carnell and her long-term partner, Ray Kiley, married at a ceremony conducted at Old Parliament House in Canberra.

In April 2013, Carnell received an honorary doctorate from the University of Canberra.

In October 2019 she was named one of The Australian Financial Review's 100 Women of Influence in the Public Policy category.

See also
 First Carnell Ministry
 Second Carnell Ministry
 List of female heads of government in Australia

References

External links

Australian chief executives
Chief Ministers of the Australian Capital Territory
1955 births
Living people
Liberal Party of Australia members of the Australian Capital Territory Legislative Assembly
Members of the Australian Capital Territory Legislative Assembly
Officers of the Order of Australia
Delegates to the Australian Constitutional Convention 1998
Leaders of the Opposition in the Australian Capital Territory
Treasurers of the Australian Capital Territory
Recipients of the Centenary Medal
20th-century Australian politicians
20th-century Australian women politicians
Women heads of government of Australian states and territories
Women members of the Australian Capital Territory Legislative Assembly
Ombudsmen in Australia